Christianity and Islam are the two largest religions in the world, with 2.8 billion and 1.9 billion adherents, respectively. Both religions are considered as Abrahamic, and are monotheistic, originating in the Middle East.

Christianity developed out of Second Temple Judaism in the 1st century CE. It is founded on the life, teachings, death, and resurrection of Jesus Christ, and those who follow it are called Christians. Islam developed in the 7th century CE. Islam is founded on the teachings of Muhammad, as an expression of surrender to the will of God. Those who follow it are called Muslims which means "submitter to God".

Muslims view Christians to be People of the Book, and also regard them as kafirs (unbelievers) committing shirk (polytheism) because of the Trinity, and thus, contend that they must be dhimmis (religious taxpayers) under Sharia law. Christians similarly possess a wide range of views about Islam. The majority of Christians view Islam as a false religion due to the fact that its adherents reject the Trinity, the divinity of Christ, the Crucifixion and Resurrection of Christ.

Islam considers Jesus to be the al-Masih (Arabic for Messiah) who was sent to guide the Banī Isrā'īl (Arabic for Children of Israel) with a new revelation: al-Injīl (Arabic for "the Gospel"). Christianity also believes Jesus to be the Messiah prophesied in the Hebrew scriptures.  However, far more central to the Christian faith is that Jesus is the incarnated God, specifically, one of the hypostases of the Triune God, God the Son. Belief in Jesus is a fundamental part of both Christian and Islamic theology.

Christianity and Islam have different sacred scriptures. The sacred text of Christianity is the Bible while the sacred text of Islam is the Quran. Muslims believe that al-Injīl was distorted or altered to form the Christian New Testament. Christians, on the contrary, do not have a univocal understanding of the Quran, though most believe that it is fabricated or apocryphal work. There are similarities in both texts, such as accounts of the life and works of Jesus and the virgin birth of Jesus through Mary; yet still, some Biblical and Quranic accounts of these events differ.

Similarities and differences
In the Islamic tradition, Christians, as well as, Jews, are believed to worship the same God that Muslims worship. However, to some, there are many different opinions in the discussion of whether Muslims and Christians worship the same God.  A greater problem is that "worships x" is what analytic philosophers, like Peter van Inwage, a leading professor in the philosophy of religion, label an "intensional (as opposed to extensional) context", where the term "x" does not have to refer to anything at all (as in, e.g., "Jason worships Zeus"). In an "intensional context" co-referring terms cannot be replaced without affecting the truth value of the statement. For instance, even though "Jupiter" may refer to the same entity as "Zeus", still Jason, a Greek, does not worship Jupiter and may not even be aware of the Roman deity. So it cannot be said that "Abdul," a Muslim, worships Yahweh, even if Yahweh and Allah are co-referring names.

Scriptures
The Christian Bible is made up of the Old Testament and the New Testament. The Old Testament was written over a period of two millennia prior to the birth of Christ. The New Testament was written in the decades following the death of Christ.  Historically, Christians universally believed that the entire Bible was the divinely inspired Word of God.  However, the rise of higher criticism during the Enlightenment has led to a diversity of views concerning the authority and inerrancy of the Bible in different denominations. Christians consider the Quran to be a non-divine set of texts.

The Quran dates from the early 7th century, or decades thereafter. Muslims believe it was revealed to Muhammad, gradually over a period of approximately 23 years, beginning on 22 December 609, when Muhammad was 40, and concluding in 632, the year of his death. The Quran assumes familiarity with major narratives recounted in the Jewish and Christian scriptures. It summarizes some, dwells at length on others and differs in others. Muslims believe that Jesus was given the Injil (Greek evangel, or Gospel) by Allah and that parts of these teachings were lost or distorted (tahrif) to produce the Hebrew Bible and the Christian New Testament. The majority of Muslims consider the Quran to be the only revealed book that has been protected by God from distortion or corruption, being remained unchanged and unedited since the death of Muhammad, though scholars and early Islamic sources reject this traditionalist view.

Jesus

Muslims and Christians both believe that Jesus was born to Mary, a virgin. They both also believe that Jesus is the Messiah. However, they differ on other key issues regarding Jesus. Christians believe that Jesus was the incarnated Son of God, divine, and sinless. Islam teaches that Jesus was one of the most important prophets of God, but not the Son of God, not divine, and not part of the Trinity. Rather, Muslims believe the creation of Jesus was similar to the creation of Adam (Adem).

Christianity and Islam also differ in their fundamental views related to the crucifixion and resurrection of Jesus. Christianity teaches that Jesus was condemned to death by the Sanhedrin and the Roman prefect Pontius Pilate, crucified, and after three days, resurrected. Islam teaches that Jesus was a human prophet who, like the other prophets, tried to bring his people to worship God, termed Tawhid. Muslims also believe that Jesus was condemned to crucifixion and then miraculously saved from execution, and was raised to the heavens. In Islam, instead of Jesus being crucified, his lookalike was crucified.

Both Christians and Muslims believe in the Second Coming of Jesus. Christianity does not state where will Jesus return, while the Hadith in Islam states that Jesus will return at a white minaret at the east of Damascus (believed to be the Minaret of Isa in the Umayyad Mosque), and will pray behind Mahdi. Christians believe that Jesus will return to kill the Antichrist and similarly Muslims believe that Jesus will return to kill Dajjal. Many Christians believe that Jesus would then rule for 1,000 years, while Muslims believe Jesus will rule for forty years, marry, have children and will be buried at the Green Dome.

Muhammad

Muslims believe that Muhammad was a prophet, who received revelations (Quran) by God through the angel Gabriel (Jibril), gradually over a period of approximately 23 years, beginning on 22 December 609, when Muhammad was 40, and concluding in 632, the year of his death. Muslims regard the Quran as the most important miracle of Muhammad, a proof of his prophethood, and the culmination of a series of divine messages that started with the messages revealed to Adam and ended with Muhammad. Muslims also believe that the reference to the Paraclete in the Bible is a prophecy of the coming of Muhammad.

Muslims revere Muhammad as the embodiment of the perfect believer and take his actions and sayings as a model of ideal conduct. Unlike Jesus, who Christians believe was God's son, Muhammad was a mortal, albeit with extraordinary qualities. Today many Muslims believe that it is wrong to represent Muhammad, but this was not always the case. At various times and places pious Muslims represented Muhammad although they never worshiped these images.

During the lifetime of Muhammad, he had many interactions with Christians. One of the first Christians who met Muhammad was Waraqah ibn Nawfal, a Christian priest of ancient Arabia. He was one of the first hanifs to believe in the prophecy of Muhammad. Muhammad also met the Najrani Christians and made peace with them. One of the earliest recorded comment of a Christian reaction to Muhammad can be dated to only a few years after Muhammad's death. As stories of the Arab prophet spread to Christian Syria, an old man who was asked about the "prophet who has appeared with the Saracens" responded: "He is false, for the prophets do not come armed with a sword."

God

In Christianity, the most common name of God is Yahweh. In Islam, the most common name of God is Allah, similar to Eloah in the Old Testament. The vast majority of the world's Christians adhere to the doctrine of the Trinity, which in creedal formulations states that God is three hypostases (the Father, the Son and the Spirit) in one ousia (substance). In Islam, this concept is deemed to be a denial of monotheism, and thus a sin of shirk, which is considered to be a major 'al-Kaba'ir' sin.  The Quran itself refers to Trinity in Al-Ma'ida 5:73 which says "They have certainly disbelieved who say, "Allah is the third of three." And there is no god except one God. And if they do not desist from what they are saying, there will surely afflict the disbelievers among them a painful punishment." Islam has the concept of Tawhid which is the concept of a single, indivisible God, who has no partners.

The Holy Spirit

Christians and Muslims have differing views about the Holy Spirit. Most Christians believe that the Holy Spirit is God, and the third member of the Trinity. In Islam, the Holy Spirit is generally believed to be the angel Gabriel. Most Christians believe that the Paraclete referred to in the Gospel of John, who was manifested on the day of Pentecost, is the Holy Spirit. Most Muslims believe that the reference to the Paraclete is a prophecy of the coming of Muhammad.

One of the key verses concerning the Paraclete is John 16:7:

Salvation

The Catechism of the Catholic Church, the official doctrine document released by the Roman Catholic Church, has this to say regarding Muslims:

Protestant theology mostly emphasizes the necessity of faith in Jesus as a savior in order for salvation. Muslims may receive salvation in theologies relating to Universal reconciliation, but will not according to most Protestant theologies based on justification through faith:

The Quran explicitly promises salvation for all those righteous Christians who were there before the arrival of Muhammad:

The Quran also makes it clear that the Christians will be nearest in love to those who follow the Quran and praises Christians for being humble and wise:

Early and Medieval Christian writers on Islam and Muhammad

John of Damascus
In 746 John of Damascus (sometimes St. John of Damascus) wrote the Fount of Knowledge part two of which is entitled Heresies in Epitome: How They Began and Whence They Drew Their Origin. In this work St. John makes extensive reference to the Quran and, in St. John's opinion, its failure to live up to even the most basic scrutiny. The work is not exclusively concerned with the Ismaelites (a name for the Muslims as they claimed to have descended from Ismael) but all heresy. The Fount of Knowledge references several suras directly often with apparent incredulity.

Theophanes the Confessor
Theophanes the Confessor (died c.822) wrote a series of chronicles (284 onwards and 602-813 AD) based initially on those of the better known George Syncellus. Theophanes reports about Muhammad thus:

Niketas
In the work A History of Christian-Muslim Relations Hugh Goddard mentions both John of Damascus and Theophanes and goes on to consider the relevance of Niketas Byzantios  who formulated replies to letters on behalf of Emperor Michael III (842-867). Goddard sums up Niketas' view:

Goddard further argues that Niketas demonstrates in his work a knowledge of the entire Quran, including an extensive knowledge of Suras 2-18. Niketas' account from behind the Byzantine frontier apparently set a strong precedent for later writing both in tone and points of argument.

11th century
Knowledge and depictions of Islam continued to be varied within the Christian West during the 11th century. For instance, the author(s) of the 11th century Song of Roland evidently had little actual knowledge of Islam. As depicted in this epic poem, Muslims erect statues of Mohammed and worship them, and Mohammed is part of an "Unholy Trinity" together with the Classical Greek Apollyon and Termagant, a completely fictional deity. This view, evidently confusing Islam with the pre-Christian Graeco-Roman Religion, appears to reflect misconceptions prevalent in Western Christian society at the time.

On the other hand, ecclesiastic writers such as Amatus of Montecassino or Geoffrey Malaterra in Norman Southern Italy, who occasionally lived among Muslims themselves, would depict at times Muslims in a negative way but would depict equally any other (ethnic) group that was opposed to the Norman rule such as Byzantine Greeks or Italian Lombards. Often the depictions would depend on context: when writing about neutral events, Muslims would be called according to geographical terms such as "Saracens" or "Sicilians, when reporting events where Muslims came into conflict with Normans, Muslims would be called "pagans" or "infidels".

Similarities were occasionally acknowledged such as by Pope Gregory VII wrote in a letter to the Hammadid emir an-Nasir that both Christians and Muslims "worship and confess the same God though in diverse forms and daily praise".

The Divine Comedy
In  Dante Alighieri's Divine Comedy,  Muhammad is in the ninth ditch of Malebolge, the eighth realm, designed for those who have caused schism; specifically, he was placed among the Sowers of Religious Discord.  Muhammad is portrayed as split in half, with his entrails hanging out, representing his status as a heresiarch (Canto 28).

This scene is frequently shown in illustrations of the Divine Comedy. Muhammad is represented in a 15th-century fresco Last Judgment by Giovanni da Modena and drawing on Dante, in the San Petronio Basilica in Bologna, as well as in artwork by Salvador Dalí, Auguste Rodin, William Blake, and Gustave Doré.

Catholic Church and Islam

Second Vatican Council and Nostra aetate
The question of Islam was not on the agenda when Nostra aetate was first drafted, or even at the opening of the Second Vatican Council. However, as in the case of the question of Judaism, several events came together again to prompt a consideration of Islam. By the time of the Second Session of the Council in 1963 reservations began to be raised by bishops of the Middle East about the inclusion of this question. The position was taken that either the question will not be raised at all, or if it were raised, some mention of the Muslims should be made. Melkite patriarch Maximos IV was among those pushing for this latter position.

Early in 1964 Cardinal Bea notified Cardinal Cicognani, President of the Council's Coordinating Commission, that the Council fathers wanted the Council to say something about the great monotheistic religions, and in particular about Islam. The subject, however, was deemed to be outside the competence of Bea's Secretariat for the Promotion of Christian Unity. Bea expressed willingness to "select some competent people and with them to draw up a draft" to be presented to the Coordinating Commission. At a meeting of the Coordinating Commission on 16–17 April Cicognani acknowledged that it would be necessary to speak of the Muslims.

The period between the first and second sessions saw the change of pontiff from Pope John XXIII to Pope Paul VI, who had been a member of the circle (the Badaliya) of the Islamologist Louis Massignon. Pope Paul VI chose to follow the path recommended by Maximos IV and he therefore established commissions to introduce what would become paragraphs on the Muslims in two different documents, one of them being Nostra aetate, paragraph three, the other being Lumen gentium, paragraph 16.

The text of the final draft bore traces of Massignon's influence. The reference to Mary, for example, resulted from the intervention of Monsignor Descuffi, the Latin archbishop of Smyrna with whom Massignon collaborated in reviving the cult of Mary at Smyrna. The commendation of Muslim prayer may reflect the influence of the Badaliya.

In Lumen gentium, the Second Vatican Council declares that the plan of salvation also includes Muslims, due to their professed monotheism.

Recent Catholic-Islamic controversies
 For the controversy surrounding Muslim prayer in Spain, see Muslim campaign at Córdoba Cathedral
 For criticism of interfaith dialogue with Muslims, see Pierre Claverie#Relations with Islam
 For the controversy over whether Islam is a religion or a political system, see Raymond Leo Burke#Islam and immigration
 For the controversy over advice not to marry a Muslim and move to an Islamic country, see José Policarpo#Marriages with Muslim men
 For the controversy over whether Catholics may call God "Allah" if they want to, see Titular Roman Catholic Archbishop of Kuala Lumpur v Menteri Dalam Negeri
 For the controversy over remarks by Pope Benedict XVI, see Regensburg lecture and Pope Benedict XVI and Islam

Protestantism and Islam

Protestantism and Islam entered into contact during the 16th century, at a time when Protestant movements in northern Europe coincided with the expansion of the Ottoman Empire in southern Europe. As both were in conflict with the Catholic Holy Roman Empire, numerous exchanges occurred, exploring religious similarities and the possibility of trade and military alliances. Relations became more conflictual in the early modern and modern periods, although recent attempts have been made at rapprochement.

Mormonism and Islam

Mormonism and Islam have been compared to one another ever since the earliest origins of the former in the nineteenth century, often by detractors of one religion or the other—or both. For instance, Joseph Smith, the founding prophet of Mormonism, was referred to as "the modern Mahomet" by the New York Herald, shortly after his murder in June 1844. This epithet repeated a comparison that had been made from Smith's earliest career, one that was not intended at the time to be complimentary. Comparison of the Mormon and Muslim prophets still occurs today, sometimes for derogatory or polemical reasons but also for more scholarly and neutral purposes. While Mormonism and Islam certainly have many similarities, there are also significant, fundamental differences between the two religions. Mormon–Muslim relations have historically been cordial; recent years have seen increasing dialogue between adherents of the two faiths, and cooperation in charitable endeavors, especially in the Middle and Far East.

Christianity and Druze

Christianity and Druze are Abrahamic religions that share a historical traditional connection with some major theological differences. The two faiths share a common place of origin in the Middle East, and consider themselves to be monotheistic. Even though the faith originally developed out of Ismaili Islam, Druze do not identify as Muslim.

The relationship between the Druze and Christians has been characterized by harmony and coexistence, with amicable relations between the two groups prevailing throughout history, with the exception of some periods, including 1860 Mount Lebanon civil war. Over the centuries a number of the Druze embraced Christianity, such as some of Shihab dynasty members, as well as the Abi-Lamma clan.

Contact between Christians (members of the Maronite, Eastern Orthodox, Melkite and other churches) and the Unitarian Druze led to the presence of mixed villages and towns in Mount Lebanon, Jabal al-Druze, Galilee, and Mount Carmel. The Maronites and the Druze founded modern Lebanon in the early eighteenth century, through the ruling and social system known as the "Maronite-Druze dualism" in Mount Lebanon Mutasarrifate.

Christianity does not include belief in reincarnation or the transmigration of the soul, unlike the Druze. Christians engage in evangelism, often through the establishment of missions, unlike the Druze who do not accept converts; even marriage outside the Druze faith is rare and strongly discouraged. Similarities between the Druze and Christians include commonalities in their view of views on marriage and divorce, as well as belief in the oneness of God and theophany. The Druze faith incorporates some elements of Christianity, and other religious beliefs.

Both faiths give a prominent place to Jesus: Jesus is the central figure of Christianity, and in the Druze faith, Jesus is considered an important prophet of God, being among the seven prophets who appeared in different periods of history. Both religions venerated John the Baptist, Saint George, Elijah, and other common figures.

Artistic influences

Islamic art and culture have both influenced and been influenced by Christian art and culture. Some arts have received such influence strongly, particularly religious architecture in the Byzantine and medieval eras

See also

 Ashtiname of Muhammad
 Chrislam (Yoruba), a syncretist religion
 Christian influences in Islam
 Christian philosophy
 Christianity and other religions
 Christianity and war
 Crusades
 Constantinople
 Divisions of the world in Islam
 Islam and other religions
 Islamic philosophy
 Islam and war
 Muhammad's views on Christians

References

Further reading
 Abdiyah Akbar Abdul-Haqq, Sharing Your [Christian] Faith with a Muslim, Minneapolis: Bethany House Publishers, 1980. 
 Giulio Basetti-Sani, The Koran in the Light of Christ: a Christian Interpretation of the Sacred Book of Islam, trans. by W. Russell-Carroll and Bede Dauphinee, Chicago, Ill.: Franciscan Herald Press, 1977. 
 Roger Arnaldez, Jésus: Fils de Marie, prophète de l'Islam, coll. Jésus et Jésus-Christ, no 13, Paris: Desclée, 1980. 
 Kenneth Cragg, The Call of the Minaret, Third ed., Oxford: Oneworld [sic] Publications, 2000, xv, 358 p. 
 Maria Jaoudi, Christian & Islamic Spirituality: Sharing a Journey, Mahwah, N.J.: Paulist Press, 1992. iii, 103 p. 
 Jane Dammen McAuliffe, Qur'anic Christians: An Analysis of Classical and Modern Exegesis, Cambridge: Cambridge University Press, 1991. 
 Frithjof Schuon, Christianity/Islam: Essays on Esoteric Ecumenicism, in series, The Library of Traditional Wisdom, Bloomington, Ind.: World Wisdom Books, cop. 1985. vii, 270 p. N.B.: Trans. from French. ; the ISBN on the verso of the t.p. surely is erroneous.
 Mark D. Siljander and John David Mann, A Deadly Misunderstanding: a Congressman's Quest to Bridge the Muslim-Christian Divide, New York: Harper One, 2008. .
 Robert Spencer, Not Peace But a Sword: The Great Chasm Between Christianity and Islam.  Catholic Answers. March 25, 2013. .
 Thomas, David, Muhammad in Medieval Christian-Muslim Relations (Medieval Islam), in Muhammad in History, Thought, and Culture: An Encyclopedia of the Prophet of God (2 vols.), Edited by C. Fitzpatrick and A. Walker, Santa Barbara, ABC-CLIO, 2014, Vol. I, pp. 392–400. 1610691776

External links

 Hasib Sabbagh: A Legacy of Understanding from the Dean Peter Krogh Foreign Affairs Digital Archives
  "I'm Right, You're Wrong, Go to Hell" – Religions and the meeting of civilization by Bernard Lewis
 Islam & Christianity (IRAN & GEORGIA) News Photos